Santiago de Lucanamarca District is one of four districts of the province Huanca Sancos in Peru.

Geography 
Other mountains are listed below:

The largest lake of the district is Qalla Qucha on the border with the Sancos District.

Ethnic groups 
The people in the district are mainly indigenous citizens of Quechua descent. Quechua is the language which the majority of the population (95.22%) learnt to speak in childhood, 4.38% of the residents started speaking using the Spanish language (2007 Peru Census).

See also 
 Lucanamarca massacre

References